Claudine Muno (born 2 July 1979, in Luxembourg City) is a Luxembourgian author, singer, musician, music teacher, and journalist.

Early life and education
Claudine Muno spent her childhood in southern Luxembourg town of Pétange and finished secondary school with a diploma in modern languages, literature, and Latin. She received an undergraduate degree in History at the University of Strasbourg, France, where she wrote a dissertation on Luxembourgish film: Peur de l'oubli - Peur de l'autre. Les films et documentaires luxembourgeois ayant pour sujet la Deuxième Guerre Mondiale (French: Fear of forgetting, fear of the Other. Luxembourgish films and documentaries covering the Second World War).

Career
After graduating, she became the full-time cultural editor of the Luxembourgish weekly left/green-wing magazine woxx. As of 2007, she has been teaching music in the Neie Lycée, a pilot secondary school in Luxembourg City.

Author
In 1996, Muno's first publication was a triple surprise for the Luxembourgish book market: the author was not only female (which was rare until then), she was also young (16 years old), and she wrote in English, a language rarely used in Luxembourg literature. In the following years, Muno has published a novel in French, one in German, and three in Luxembourgish. She has also co-authored two children picture storybooks with Pascale Junker who did the illustrations, and she has written two plays in Luxembourgish: Speck and Krakullen. Book critics have compared her writing style to the Belgian writer Amélie Nothomb.

Musician
Although Muno's first CD was first published by her book publisher, she is nationally and internationally known as Claudine Muno and The Luna Boots, who have already produced two albums. Much to her dismay, her singing style and voice has sometimes been compared to Jewel and Alanis Morissette.

Awards
 Prix littéraire national 2000 (National Literary Prize) for her short-story Crickets
 Servais Prize (2004) for her novel Frigo

Bibliography
 Muno, Claudine: The Moon of the Big Winds. Esch-sur-Sûre (Luxembourg): Op der Lay, 1996.
 Muno, Claudine: Träume, aus denen man zu spät aufwacht. Esch-sur-Sûre (Luxembourg): Op der Lay, 1997.
 Junker, Pascale & Muno, Claudine: Dem Zoe seng Geschichten. Esch-sur-Sûre (Luxembourg): Op der Lay,  1998.
 Junker, Pascale & Muno, Claudine: D'Zoe, Draachen a Siweschléifer. Dem Zoe seng Geschichten 2. Esch-sur-Sûre (Luxembourg): Op der Lay, 1999.
 Muno, Claudine: 21. Esch-sur-Sûre (Luxembourg): Op der Lay, 1999.
 Muno, Claudine: De Fleeschkinnek. Esch-sur-Sûre (Luxembourg): Op der Lay, 2002.
 Muno, Claudine: Frigo. Esch-sur-Sûre (Luxembourg): Op der Lay. 2003.
 Muno, Claudine: Koma. Esch-sur-Sûre (Luxembourg): Op der Lay, 2005.
 Muno, Claudine: d'welt geet ënner, nils poulet. Esch-sur-Sûre (Luxembourg): Op der Lay, 2006.

Discography
 Muno, Claudine: Fish out of Water. Esch-sur-Sûre (Luxembourg): Op der Lay, 1998.
 Claudine Muno and The Luna Boots: faith + love + death. Maskénada (Luxembourg), 2004.
 Claudine Muno and The Luna Boots: Monsters. Esch-sur-Sûre (Luxembourg): Op der Lay, 1998.
 Claudine Muno and The Luna Boots: Petites chansons méchantes. Green l.f.ant Records, Brussels, 2007.
 Claudine Muno and The Luna Boots: Noctambul. Green l.f.ant Records, Brussels, 2010.
 Claudine Muno and The Luna Boots: Carmagnoles (Compilation). Volvox Music, Moret-sur-Loing (France), 2011.

External links
 Claudine Muno (CNL) (in French)
 Éditions Op der Lay
 The Luna Boots Official Facebook
 entry of Claudine Muno in the Centre National de littérature, Luxembourg (in French)

1979 births
Living people
Luxembourgian novelists
Luxembourgian educators
Women novelists
21st-century Luxembourgian women singers
People from Luxembourg City